Antonio Riva (8 April 1896 Shanghai – 17 August 1951 Beijing) was an Italian pilot and a World War I flying ace, credited with seven confirmed and seven unconfirmed aerial victories. In 1951, he was executed by firing squad under the newly established People's Republic of China for allegedly conspiring to assassinate Mao Zedong and other Communist leaders.

Early life and infantry service 
Antonio Riva was born in Shanghai, China on 8 April 1896 from a family of wealthy merchants from Gorgonzola, Achille Riva and Teresa Barbaran Capra; the couple moved to China in 1880 to export silk in Italy. Being of Italian heritage, he returned to Italy as World War I engulfed Europe. He volunteered as a reserve officer on 31 December 1914, before Italy entered the war. On 11 July 1915, he was commissioned a Sottotenente in the Italian Army's 70th Infantry Regiment. On 12 November 1915, he was wounded, not returning to duty until 16 March 1916. He was transferred to the 201st Infantry Regiment on 15 June 1916; on 30 June he was once again wounded in action. He returned to the front with the 44th Infantry Regiment on 22 August 1916. The next month, he went on leave; upon his return, he found himself bucked to the 49th Infantry Regiment. However, on 25 September 1916, he was accepted for pilot's training at San Giusto.

World War I aerial service 
Riva became a Tenente (Lieutenant) while in aviation training; his promotion was effective 25 February 1917. He completed his training in April 1917, while stationed in Foggia. His first assignment was to a reconnaissance two-seater unit, 29a Squadriglia. After just 12 sorties with them, he undertook fighter conversion training on Nieuports in June 1917. In July, he underwent gunnery school at San Giusto. On 19 July, he was posted to a fighter squadron, 73a Squadriglia. He transferred out to 71a Squadriglia at the end of July.

Riva began his successes while flying a Nieuport 11 with this fighter squadron when he shared a victory with Antonio Amantea and another Italian pilot. The trio shot down Austro-Hungarian ace Julius Kowalczik in his Albatros D.III on 24 August 1917. Riva was promoted to Capitano on 31 October 1917. He switched over to command 78a Squadriglia on 12 November 1917 and changed mounts to a Hanriot HD.1. His next successes came on 26 December 1917, when he shot down a DFW reconnaissance plane solo, followed by a second win over another DFW, shared with Silvio Scaroni and three British pilots. A month later, on 27 January 1918, Riva teamed with Guglielmo Fornagiari for a fourth victory. On 15 June 1918, Riva became an ace. He and Amedeo Mecozzi teamed to down a Hansa-Brandenburg C.I. After a string of five unconfirmed claims, he would down two more planes in 1918, to bring his total to seven; he had an equal number of unconfirmed claims. Riva was assigned on 10 September 1918 as commanding officer to form a new squadron, 90a Squadriglia, equipped with a new fighter aircraft, the SVA 5. During this assignment, he continued to fly, and post his victory claims with, 78a Squadriglia. Antonio Riva ended World War I having been awarded the Silver Medal for Military Valor and the Knight's Cross of the Military Order of Savoy.

List of aerial victories

Confirmed victories are numbered and listed chronologically. Unconfirmed victories are denoted by "u/c" and may or may not be listed by date.

Post World War I
On 1 February 1919, the Bongiovanni commission review of the aerial victories of the Italian Army's pilots confirmed seven of Antonio Riva's aerial victory claims. In 1920, Riva was stationed in China, placed in charge of the Chinese stopovers for a Rome to Tokyo flight. He was discharged in January 1921.

Little is known of the next couple of decades, except that Riva remained in the Reserves of the Regia Aeronautica as late as February 1935.

Death
Antonio was executed in Beijing, People's Republic of China, by a firing squad in 1951, along with a Japanese citizen, Ruichi Yamaguchi. They were convicted of being involved in a plot to assassinate Mao Zedong and other high-ranking Communist officials. The plot allegedly involved attacking Mao and other officials atop Tiananmen Gate with a mortar on 1 October 1950, during National Day celebrations.

However, there were several issues with the plot. Most obviously, the idea that two foreigners could carry a mortar all the way to Tiananmen Square during a large celebration seems highly improbable. The mortar seized from Riva's house was a nonfunctional part of an antique from the 1930s which could not have been used to attack anyone. Riva had found the antique in a junk pile outside the Holy See legation; the priest whose house was next to the other parts of the mortar was imprisoned for life. A map of the square seized from Yamaguchi's house and used as evidence was actually commissioned by the Beijing Fire Department, to whom Yamaguchi was selling firefighting equipment. It was alleged that the ringleader of the plot was an American serviceman named David Barrett, but he was simply a neighbor to the two who had moved out a year before. In any case, the incident was used to banish the Holy See from China. Two decades later, PRC prime minister Zhou Enlai apologized to Barrett and invited him back to China.

References

Citations

Sources 
 Franks, Norman; Guest, Russell; Alegi, Gregory.  Above the War Fronts: The British Two-seater Bomber Pilot and Observer Aces, the British Two-seater Fighter Observer Aces, and the Belgian, Italian, Austro-Hungarian and Russian Fighter Aces, 1914–1918: Volume 4 of Fighting Airmen of WWI Series: Volume 4 of Air Aces of WWI. Grub Street, 1997. , .

1896 births
1951 deaths
People executed by China by firing squad
Italian World War I flying aces
Italian people executed abroad
Executed Italian people
People from Shanghai
Italian expatriates in China